Statistics of Guam League for the 2008–09 season.

Final standings

References
Guam 2008/09 (RSSSF)

Guam Soccer League seasons
Guam
Mens